The Korean Republic won, unofficially the South Korean won (Symbol: ₩; Code: KRW; Korean: 대한민국 원) is the official currency of South Korea. A single won is divided into 100 jeon, the monetary subunit. The jeon is no longer used for everyday transactions, and it appears only in foreign exchange rates. The currency is issued by the Bank of Korea, based in the capital city of Seoul.

Etymology

The old "won" was a cognate of the Chinese yuan and Japanese yen, which were both derived from the Spanish-American silver dollar. It is derived from the hanja  (won), meaning "round", which describes the shape of the silver dollar.

The won was subdivided into 100 jeon, itself a cognate of the Chinese unit of weight mace and synonymous with money in general. The current won (1962 to present) is written in hangul only and does not officially have any hanja associated with it.

First South Korean won

History
The Korean won, Chinese yuan and Japanese yen were all derived from the Spanish-American silver dollar, a coin widely used for international trade between Asia and the Americas from the 16th to 19th centuries.

During the colonial era under the Japanese (1910–45), the won was replaced by the Korean yen which was at par with the Japanese Yen.

After World War II ended in 1945, Korea was divided, resulting in two separate currencies, both called won, for the South and the North. Both the Southern won and the Northern won replaced the yen at par. The first South Korean won was subdivided into 100 jeon.

The South Korean won initially had a fixed exchange rate to the U.S. dollar at a rate of 15 won to 1 dollar. A series of devaluations followed, the later ones, in part, due to the Korean War (1950–53). The pegs were:

The first South Korean won was replaced by the hwan on February 15, 1953, at a rate of 1 hwan = 100 won.

Banknotes
In 1946, the Bank of Joseon introduced 10 and 100 won notes. These were followed in 1949 by 5 and 1,000 won notes.

A new central bank, the Bank of Korea, was established on 12 June 1950, and assumed the duties of Bank of Joseon. Notes were introduced (some dated 1949) in denominations of 5, 10 and 50 jeon, and 100 and 1,000 won. The 500 won notes were introduced in 1952. In 1953, a series of banknotes was issued which, although it gave the denominations in English in won, were, in fact, the first issues of the hwan.

Second South Korean won

History
The won was reintroduced on June 10, 1962, at a rate of 1 won = 10 hwan. It became the sole legal tender on March 22, 1975, with the withdrawal of the last circulating hwan coins. Its ISO 4217 code is KRW. At the reintroduction of the won in 1962, its value was pegged at 125 won = US$1. The following pegs operated between 1962 and 1980:

On February 27, 1980, efforts were initiated to lead to a floating exchange rate. The won was finally allowed to float on December 24, 1997, when an agreement was signed with the International Monetary Fund. Shortly after, the won was devalued to almost half of its value, as part of the 1997 Asian financial crisis.

Coins
Until 1966, 10 and 50 hwan coins, revalued as 1 and 5 won, were the only coins in circulation. New coins, denominated in won, were introduced by the Bank of Korea on August 16, 1966, in denominations of 1, 5 and 10 won, with the 1 won struck in brass and the 5 and 10 won in bronze. These were the first South Korean coins to display the date in the common era, earlier coins having used the Korean calendar. The 10 and 50 hwan coins were demonetized on March 22, 1975.

In 1968, as the intrinsic value of the brass 1 won coin far surpassed its face value, new aluminium 1 won coins were issued to replace them. As an attempt to further reduce currency production costs, new 5 and 10 won coins were issued in 1970, struck in brass. Cupronickel 100 won coins were also introduced that year, followed by cupronickel 50 won coins in 1972.

In 1982, with inflation and the increasing popularity of vending machines, 500 won coins were introduced on June 12, 1982. In January 1983, with the purpose of standardizing the coinage, a new series of 1, 5, 10, 50, and 100 won coins was issued, using the same layout as the 500 won coins, but conserving the coins' old themes.

The Bank of Korea announced in early 2006 its intention to redesign the 10 won coin by the end of that year. With the increasing cost of production, then at 38 won per 10 won coin, and rumors that some people had been melting the coins to make jewelry, the redesign was needed to make the coin more cost-effective to produce. The new coin is made of copper-coated aluminium with a reduced diameter of 18 mm, and a weight of 1.22 g. Its visual design is the same as the old coin. The new coin was issued on December 18, 2006.

The 1 and 5 won coins are rarely in circulation since 1992, and prices of consumer goods are rounded to the nearest 10 won. However, they are still in production, minting limited amounts of these two coins every year, for the Bank of Korea's annual mint sets.
In 1998, the production costs per coin were: 10 won coins each cost 35 won to produce, 100 won coins cost 58 won, and 500 won coins cost 77 won.

Banknotes
The Bank of Korea designates banknote and coin series in a unique way. Instead of putting those of similar design and issue dates in the same series, it assigns series number X to the Xth design of a given denomination. The series numbers are expressed with Korean letters used in alphabetical order, e.g. . Therefore, ₩1,000 issued in 1983 is series II because it is the second design of all ₩1,000 designs since the introduction of the South Korean won in 1962.

In 1962, 10 and 50 jeon, 1, 5, 10, 50, 100 and 500 won notes were introduced by the Bank of Korea. The first issue of 1, 5, 10, 50, 100 and 500 won notes was printed in the UK by Thomas De La Rue. The jeon notes together with a second issue of 10 and 100 won notes were printed domestically by the Korea Minting and Security Printing Corporation.

In 1965, 100 won notes (series III) were printed using intaglio printing techniques, for the first time on domestically printed notes, to reduce counterfeiting. Replacements for the British 500 won notes followed in 1966, also using intaglio printing, and for the 50 won notes in 1969 using lithoprinting.

With the economic development from the 1960s, the value of the 500 won notes fell, resulting in a greater use of cashier's checks with higher fixed denominations as means of payment, as well as an increased use of counterfeited ones. In 1970, the 100 won notes were replaced by coins, with the same happening to the 50 won notes in 1972.

Higher-denomination notes of 5,000 and 10,000 won were introduced in 1972 and 1973, respectively. The notes incorporated new security features, including watermark, security thread, and ultraviolet response fibres, and were intaglio printed. The release of 10,000 won notes was planned to be at the same time as the 5,000 won notes, but problems with the main theme delayed it by a year. Newly designed 500 won notes were also released in 1973, and the need for a medium denomination resulted in the introduction of 1,000 won notes in 1975.

In 1982, the 500 won note was replaced by a coin. The following year, as part of its policy of rationalizing the currency system, the Bank of Korea issued a new set of notes, as well as a new set of coins. Some of the notes' most notable features were distinguishable marks for the blind under the watermark and the addition of machine-readable language in preparation for mechanization of cash handling. They were also printed on better-quality cotton pulp to reduce the production costs by extending their circulation life.

To cope with the deregulation of imports of color printers and the increasing use of computers and scanners, modified 5,000 and 10,000 won notes were released between 1994 and 2002 with various new security features, which included color-shifting ink, microprint, segmented metal thread, moiré, and EURion constellation. The latest version of the 5,000 and 10,000 won notes are easily identifiable by the copyright information inscribed under the watermark: "" and year of issue on the obverse, "© The Bank of Korea" and year of issue on the reverse.

The plates for the 5,000 won notes were produced in Japan, while the ones for the 1,000 and 10,000 won notes were produced by the Korea Minting and Security Printing Corporation. They were all printed in intaglio.

New series

Historical figures on the Korean Won and their importance in history

Yi Hwang (이황) ~ ₩1,000

Yi Hwang, the man featured on the Korean 1000 won bill, is regarded as one of Korea's most prominent Confucian scholars during the Joseon era. His vast love for knowledge and literature made him known to many and a largely popular historical figure. He dedicated his life and to teaching numerous students. When people think of Yi Hwang now, the Dosanseowon Confucian Academy(안동 도산서원) always comes to mind.[speculative - consider removing] It was established in 1574 to honor Yi Hwang (Toegye 퇴계). It was built about 6 years after his death. It was also designated as a UNESCO World Heritage site.

An Interesting fact about how the historical figures on the 1000 won and 5000 won. Yi Hwang was the head teacher and taught the man on the 5000 won. His name was Yi Yulgok, he too also became a famous Confucian scholar under Yi Hwangs guidance and was bestowed the significance of being featured on the 5000 won banknote.

Yi I (이이) ~ ₩5,000

Yi Yulgok (1536-1584) was a Neo-Confucian thinker and is known to have similar influence as Yi Hwang. Yulgok is responsible for establishing the Kiho school in Korea. He is the son of Shin Saimdang, who was a well-known poet and painter. Yulgok began studying with his mother, but when his mother died, he mourned her loss for 3 years. He then fled to a Buddhist temple in the mountains with the desire to become a monk; however, after a year of studying scriptures, he changed his mind. Given the knowledge he acquired in the Buddhist temple, he placed first in both the preliminary and final civil service examinations in 1564. He then became known as Lord First Candidate of the Nine Examinations. He served in several offices within the metropolitan and provincial government. His official posts included appointments of minister of military affairs, minister of public works, and minister of personnel until he died at age forty-nine.

Sejong the Great (세종대왕) ~ ₩10,000

Sejong the Great was a famous king during the Joseon era. His legacy includes the creation of the Korean writing system, hangul (한글), which occurred in 1443 during the 12th month of the lunar calendar. Later in 1446, the book of Sejong Sillok (조선왕조실록) described the new language of Joseon as Hunminjeongeum (full name;훈민정음 해례본, Hunminjeongeum Haeryebon), was created and information on how to learn the new system and the teachings were published all together in multiple parts. One of Sejong's purposes for creating this new language system was to help common people read and write, many of which were otherwise illiterate. Hunminjeongeum was the original name for Hangeul when it was first created back in the 15th century. The other sections of Hunminjeongeum(훈민정음) called Yeui(예의) was created to describe and teach the reader about each sound of the 28-letter alphabet. With the creation of this book, Hunminjeongeum(훈민정음), we can understand the true vision and concept Sejong the great had for creating this language and how to clearly grasp the rules and usage of it. The next part of the book was called “haerye”(해례), which showed the theories involved with the inventions of the consonants and vowels and the ideas behind the initial, middle, and final sound of a syllable.

Lastly another special distinction related to the language was, Hunminjeongeum(훈민정음) became a national treasure recognized by the UN in 1997. It was listed in the UNESCO's Memory of the World Register. It stated that this document created by Sejong was regarded highly for its linguistic, cultural, and ideological values.

Shin Saimdang (신사임당) ~ ₩50,000

Shin Saimdang (1504-1551) is a well-known historical figure and is considered the representative image of the Korean woman and icon of the “wise mother and good wife” (hyeonmoyangcheo,현모양처). Shin Saimdang was an artist, writer calligraphist and poet of the Joseon era. She became the first woman to appear on a new Korean banknote since 2009. She is the mother of Yi I and was of great influence on him. She lived in a male-dominant society because of the great influence of Confucianism. For this reason, her real name is unknown and because she is a woman, her name didn't make history. The only accounts of her origin story were from her son Yi Yulgok, unofficial history books, anthologies and from postscripts written by Confucian scholars. Her legacy and her artworks are remembered more than documents that portray her as a good wife and wise mother.

New security features

In 2006, it became a major concern that the South Korean won banknotes were being counterfeited/forged. This led the government to issue a new series of banknotes, with the 5,000 won note being the first one to be redesigned. Later in 2007, the 1,000 and 10,000 won notes were introduced.

On June 23, 2009, the Bank of Korea released the 50,000 won note. The obverse bears a portrait of Shin Saimdang, a prominent 16th-century artist, calligrapher, and mother of Korean scholar Yulgok, also known as Yi I, who is on the 5,000 won note. This note is the first Korean banknote to feature the portrait of a woman. The release of the 50,000 won note stirred some controversy among shop owners and those with visual impairments due to its similarity in color and numerical denomination with the 5,000 won note.

New 100,000 won notes were also announced, but their release was later cancelled due to the controversy over the banknote's planned image, featuring the Daedongyeojido map, and not including the disputed Dokdo islands.

The banknotes include over 10 security features in each denomination. The 50,000 won note has 22 security features, the 10,000 won note 21, the 5,000 won note 17, the 2,000 won note 10 and the 1,000 won note 19. Many modern security features that can be also found in euros, pounds, Canadian dollars, and Japanese yen are included in the banknotes.
Some security features inserted in won notes are:
 Holograms with three-dimensional images that change colors within the metallic foil on the obverse side of the notes (except ₩1,000)
 Watermark portraits of the effigy of the note are visible when held to the light in the white section of the note.
 Intaglio printing on words and the effigy give off a raised feeling, different from ordinary paper
 Security thread in the right side of the obverse side of the note with small lettering " Bank of Korea" and its corresponding denomination
 Color-shifting ink on the value number at the back of the note:
For the first time in the world, KOMSCO, the Korean mint, inserted a new substance in the notes to detect counterfeits. This technique is being exported to Europe, North America, etc.

Future of the South Korean won

Coinless trials
As the South Korean economy is evolving through the use of electronic payments, coins of the South Korean won are becoming less used by consumers. The Bank of Korea began a trial which would result in the total cessation of the production of coins by depositing change into prepaid cards. As of 2019, however, public participation in this program has decreased.

Redenomination proposals
There have been recurring proposals in the South Korean National Assembly to redenominate the won by introducing a new won or new unit, equal to 1,000 old won, and worth nearly one U.S. dollar. While proponents cite a more valuable currency unit better projects the strength of the nation's economy, a majority remain opposed to the idea. Reasons cited are: economic harm if done immediately, no issues on public confidence in the won and its inflation rate, limited cost savings, and the presence of more urgent economic issues.

Currency production
The Bank of Korea is the only institution in South Korea with the right to print banknotes and mint coins. The banknotes and coins are printed at the KOMSCO, a government-owned corporation, under the guidance of the Bank of Korea.
After the new banknotes and coins are printed/minted, they are bundled or rolled and shipped to the headquarters of the Bank of Korea. When delivered, they are deposited inside the bank's vault, ready to be distributed to commercial banks when requested.
Every year, around Seollal and Chuseok, two major Korean holidays, the Bank of Korea distributes large amounts of its currency to most of the commercial banks in South Korea, which are then given to their customers upon request.

Current exchange rates

See also

References

External links

 
 
 
 
 
 
 New South Korean won banknotes, information page of BOK's new notes
 Pronunciation of Won at freedictionary.com
 

1962 in South Korea
1962 establishments in South Korea
Currencies of South Korea
Government of South Korea
Cultural depictions of Yi Sun-sin